Italy–Russia relations are the bilateral foreign relations between the two countries, embodied in the so-called privileged relationship.

Country comparison

General
Russia has an embassy in Rome and consulates in Genoa, Milan and Palermo, and Italy has an embassy in Moscow, a consulate in Saint Petersburg, two consulate generals (in Ekaterinburg and Kaliningrad), and two embassy branches (in Samara and Volgograd). Both countries are full members of the Council of Europe and the Organization for Security and Co-operation in Europe.

History
The relationship between Russia and Italy goes back a long way.

In terms of international relations, there has been little interaction between Italy and Russia, apart from the role of Moscow's control of the Italian Communist Party from 1920 to 1991. Communities of expatriates in each other's country hardly exist. 

Italy plays an important role because this country is one of Russia’s key partners in Europe. These two countries have experienced a positive dialogue during years. As a result, these states have established various economic partnerships and bilateral political agreements.  Italy and Russia are tied together by a cultural and historical relation. Italy is interested in keeping a strong relationship for geopolitical reasons.

Russian Empire
Peter the Great and other Russian leaders looked to Italian cities for cultural models, especially in architecture and music. Italy for Russians has been the exemplar of the highest stages of culture, whether classical, Renaissance, or Baroque. For example, the Kazan Cathedral in St. Petersburg was in part modelled after St. Peter's Basilica in Rome. Classical Russian literature of the 19th and early 20th centuries was strongly influenced by Renaissance Italy.

After the victory against Napoleon in 1815, Russia challenged Austria's dominant position in northern Italy. Prince Klemens von Metternich successfully responded, and Tsar Alexander I of Russia finally went along in 1819–20.

Petrushka remains the most famous puppet show in Russia. Italian puppeteers introduced it in the first third of the 19th century. While most core characters came from Italy, they were soon transformed by the addition of material from the Russian lubki and intermedii.

Italian merchants flourished in Odesa in the 19th century. They helped develop commercial shipping in the Black Sea. They took an active role in the public and cultural life of the city and initiated projects for the improvement of business conditions in Odesa.

Tsar Nicholas I of Russia (ruled 1825–1855) was a major collector, patron and promoter of the arts. He favoured Italian culture and imposed his tastes and aesthetic orientation on the works that he bought for his personal art collection and for the New Hermitage museum, which he inaugurated in 1852.

In 1914, Italy refused to follow its official allies, Germany and Austria-Hungary, into World War I. It negotiated for a better deal with the Allies, especially in terms of gaining territory from the Austria-Hungary. Russia had its own interest in that region, which complicated negotiations, but its negotiating position was greatly weakened by its heavy military losses. Britain and France managed to make Russia by April 1915 abandon its support for most of Serbia's claims and accept terms for Italy's entry into the war, which would limit Russia's strategic presence in the postwar Adriatic.

Italian-Soviet relations
The governments of Benito Mussolini's Fascist Italy and Joseph Stalin's Soviet Union recognized each other as de jure governments of their respective countries and established diplomatic relations on 7 February 1924, shortly after the death of Vladimir Lenin.  A preliminary trade agreement had been made on 26 December 1921, which one historian noted the pact "signified the de facto recognition of the Soviet Union" by Italy. Both states signed a Treaty on Friendship, Non-Aggression and Neutrality on 2 September 1933, and although the treaty formally remained in effect until the Italian declaration of war against the Soviet Union on 22 June 1941, relations had already degraded with the advent of the Second Italo-Ethiopian War and the Spanish Civil War.

Palmiro Togliatti was the longtime leader of the Italian Communist Party from 1927 to 1964. He remained in Moscow when Mussolini's fascist government arrested all leading members of the Communist Party. The Comintern, under Stalin's guidance, chose Togliatti as the party leader for Italy. He remained in Moscow but kept the party solidly together. During World War II, he directed the Italian communist resistance and returned to Italy in 1944. Stalin did not permit the Italian communists to make an effort to take over Italy in 1944 to 1945. Togliatti kept in close touch with Moscow and became a major player in Italian politics. He was typically outmaneuvered by the Christian Democrats with their American allies.

In 1936, the League of Nations imposed economic sanctions on Italy for its aggression in Ethiopia. The Soviet Union, which was in good standing with the League at the time, generally applied the sanctions by sharply reducing its trade with Italy, in violation of the Italo-Soviet Pact. 

Italy violated the pact for the second time by promptly responding to requests by the Republic of Finland for military assistance and equipment for use against the Soviet government. The Royal Italian Air Force (Regia Aeronautica Italiana) sent thirty-five Fiat G.50 fighters, while the Royal Italian Army (Regio Esercito Italiano) supplied 94,500 new M1938 7.35 mm rifles for use by Finnish infantry. However, the Soviet Union's new partner Germany intercepted most of Italy's aid and only released it once peace had been made. A handful of Italian volunteers also fought in the Winter War on the side of Finland.

In the late 1930s, Germany planned to gain Lebensraum by invading the Soviet Union with the support from Italy, co-operation with Poland, friendship with Britain and the isolation of France. Italy was mildly supportive, but Hitler's program failed by Polish aloofness, British rejection of appeasement in 1939, Soviet strength, and the American entry to the war in support of the Soviets.

Even during the German-Soviet war, when Italy was on Germany's side fighting against the Soviets, Italian troops were known for treating Soviet civilians much better than the Germans did. After the Italians signed an act of surrender to the Allies on 29 September 1943, at the Three Powers Conference in Moscow, the Soviets, the Americans and the British adopted the Declaration Regarding Italy for the overthrow of fascism in Italy, the barring of fascists from public life and the setting up "democratic organs". The Soviet Union restored full diplomatic relations with Italy on 25 October 1944. A treaty on trade and navigation was signed on 11 December 1948.

In the decisive 1948 election, both the Soviets and the Americans intervened. The communists launched strikes, mass rallies, assaults on police stations and occupations of factories. The Americans responded by threatening military intervention in the event of a communist coup. The Christian Democrats won on an anticommunist platform, the communists were frozen out of power at the national level in Italy although they still controlled local governments in industrial cities.

Between 1958 and 1968 Italy and Soviet Union relations were part of the changes in world politics between the end of Stalinism and the beginning of détente.  A key role in the rapprochement was played by Amintore Fanfani, who in the decade 1958-1968 became Prime Minister three times and was responsible for Foreign Affairs three times. In these two roles, he was one of the most important architects of the orientation and management of Rome's international action in the decade.

In the decade 1958-1968, two moments stand out. The first phase covers the time span of the third legislature in Italy (1958-1963) and, on the Soviet side, the last five years of Khrushchev's leadership (he was dismissed in October 1964). During this five-year period, the foundations of bilateral relations were laid between Italy and the Soviet Union, both in the economic, political, cultural and technical-scientific fields. A second phase, from the end of 1964 to 1968, was characterised in the USSR by the rise of the Brezhnev leadership and in Italy by the start of the organic centre-left with the Moro governments, within which Fanfani held the role of Foreign Minister on several occasions. This phase saw the stabilisation of bilateral relations as well as cooperation, though partial and limited, in the main international issues. A period of slowdown in bilateral relations occurred between the second half of 1963 and the end of 1964, not so much due to direct political choices as to a series of important events in Italian politics, in the Soviet government and in the international framework, which placed other priorities on the two capitals. In the space of little more than a year, in fact, in Italy the organic centre-left project was realised, the schism of the Italian Socialist Party was consummated and Palmiro Togliatti died, leaving the Italian Communist Party suddenly leaderless; in the USSR, Khrushchev was dismissed and Leonid Brezhnev's secretariat was installed; furthermore, international protagonists of détente such as Kennedy and John XXIII died.

Between 1958 and 1968, Soviet diplomacy, except for a few setbacks during the most acute international crises, followed a rather linear policy towards Italy, which did not change even with the rise of Brezhnev's leadership. An assessment of the objectives achieved and the methods of action was outlined in a secret report by Moscow's ambassador in Rome Nikita Ryžov to Foreign Minister Gromyko in 1969, which reads as follows: “In recent years Italian-Soviet relations have improved significantly in all fields. The most obvious steps forward can be seen with regard to economic-commercial relations and technical-scientific relations, developed on the basis of the 1966-1969 long-term trade agreement [...] The embassy also believes that the Italian specificity is such that in the absence of a serious and stable economic basis at the root of Soviet-Italian relations, the possibilities of realising and developing a political action aimed at influencing Italian policy in our favour will be very limited. On the contrary, our exact assessment of Italy's economic interests - which in so many ways determine its foreign policy - could in certain circumstances yield the political result we need."

The USSR considered it opportune to establish political relations with Italy that also used other avenues, different from those of the PCI channel. This was the context for Moscow's attempt to establish direct relations with certain majority leaders and government exponents, an initiative that was to inaugurate a season of regular and frequent meetings. It is indicative, for example, that from 1959 to 1968 there was at least one state visit a year by a member of the Italian government to the USSR or of the Soviet government to Italy. Some were particularly significant for the resonance they had in bilateral relations, such as Gronchi's visit to the USSR in 1960 - during which the first Italian-Soviet cultural agreement was signed-, Fanfani's visit to Moscow in 1961 or Gromyko's visit to Italy in 1966.

The Soviet strategy of those years aimed at neutrality in Italian foreign policy. Italy actually maintained its Atlanticist positions but, on some issues, there was an Italian-Soviet ideological convergence such as the Berlin crisis of 1961 in which Fanfani was almost identified as a reliable spokesman and mediator of the crisis between the two superpowers.

Italy had the largest communist party in the Western world, with over 2 million members. After the Sino-Soviet Split, the party had much more room to maneuver. While not officially aligning with China, it sharply disagreed with the Soviets on numerous points. The historic compromise and the party's acceptance of pluralism at home, the Soviet invasion in Czechoslovakia, relations with the Chinese Communist Party, the Soviet invasion of Afghanistan and martial law in Poland. The Soviets offered concessions to win the party's support for their foreign policy. However, it denounced Soviet actions in Poland and suggested that both Soviet and American foreign policies were obnoxious, Pravda denounced the party's "blasphemy". The end of the Soviet Union made the party disintegrate in 1991 and split into the Democratic Party of the Left and the Communist Refoundation Party ("Rifondazione Comunista").

A strong political link between Italy and the Soviet Russia was built during the existence of the Italian Communist Party, that was the second political party for number of votes from 1950’s to the early 1990’s.

Russian Federation
After the dissolution of the Soviet Union in 1991, Italy signed a friendship treaty with the Russian Federation first in 1994 and then in 1998. Meanwhile, the two countries intensified the economic and commercial relations. At the beginning of the new century, Russian Federation started regaining economic stability and generating interesting investment opportunities. 

In 2006, Russia and Italy signed a protocol of cooperation to fight crime and defend civil liberties. There are close commercial ties between the two countries. Italy is Russia's second most important commercial partner in the EU, after Germany, and its state-owned energy company, ENI, has recently signed a large long-term contract with Gazprom to import Russian gas into Italy.

The Silvio Berlusconi governments (2001–2006 and 2008–2011) strengthened Italy's ties with Russia by the Italian prime minister's personal friendship with Russian President Vladimir Putin. 

Italy kept dialogue with Moscow even when relations with NATO countries began to crack. In 2007-2008 Italy was among the European countries (including France and Germany) most critical of the George W. Bush administration's (2001-2009) plan to deploy an anti-missile defense system in 'Eastern Europe, a measure the Russians opposed. Italy - with France and Germany - opposed the Bush administration's intention to offer Georgia and Ukraine the NATO Membership Action Plan (Map), the first step in the accession process, during the NATO summit in Bucharest of April 2008. The main reason was that the accession of Georgia and Ukraine would cause a  deterioration in relations with Russia without bringing any appreciable security advantage to the Alliance.

In 2017, Putin's party United Russia, signed a deal with the Northern League to strengthen their political cooperation. 

Former Italian Prime Minister Matteo Renzi, leader of the Democratic Party, suggested that Russian-backed organisations may have been promulgating fake news in Italy to influence electoral outcomes, and he accused the Five Stars Movement of spreading information supporting the Russian government and foreign policy. In December 2017, former US Vice President Joe Biden accused Russia of helping the opposition Five Stars Movement and Lega Nord. 

In March 2018, the Italian government, led by Paolo Gentiloni, expelled two Russian diplomats after the Skripal poisoning case in the United Kingdom.

The parties that won the 2018 election in Italy and formed a coalition government, the Lega Nord and the Five Star Movement, have been giving voice to the Italian industry's discontent with American and European sanctions on Russia.

On 22 March 2020, after a phone call with Italian Prime Minister Giuseppe Conte, Putin ordered  the Russian Army to deploy medics, special disinfection vehicles and other medical equipment to Italy, which was the European country to be most severely hit by the COVID-19 pandemic. Following a COPASIR investigation, it emerged that the operation, which according to the Italian government was a humanitarian mission, could not have been planned in a few hours and the investigation found that the Italian government had known from the beginning that it would have to pay all the expenses of the mission.

In 2021, in the continuation of the COVID-19 pandemic, commercial and cultural relations were good.
From a political point of view, over the years, the relations between Russia and Italy remain strong despite Russia’s annexation of Crimea and its military operation in Ukraine. 

When Mario Draghi formed his government in 2021, he took a clear stance in support of the EU and the West by expressing concern about civil rights violations in Russia. Draghi no longer mentioned Russia as a partner. Rather, it became an actor with which to engage a dialogue. Relations deteriorated on February 24, 2022 with the invasion of Russian troops in Ukraine.

The Russian-Ukraine crisis 
The Russian-Ukraine crisis, with the deployment of Russian troops along the entire border with Ukraine and the subsequent war with Ukraine, led Italy to open a diplomatic channel to resolve the crisis. However the Italian diplomacy failed to provide valid support to resolve the crisis with Ukraine and failed to avoid aggression against Ukraine. 
Italy has severely condemned the Russian aggression and expressed full support to Ukraine. The Russian aggression against Ukraine surprised and disconcerted Italy and European countries. Former Prime Minister Silvio Berlusconi also expressed shock at Vladimir Putin's decision to attack Ukraine.

Initially, Italy was opposed to applying harsh economic sanctions against Russia, also because they were much more penalizing economically for Italy itself than for Russia, however it had to adhere to the European plan of harsh but gradual economic sanctions against Russia.

Italian public opinion has been strongly shocked and worried by the attack on Ukraine, also because it considered this war as unjustified and unjustifiable, fratricidal between populations of Rus' origin and with the same Orthodox Christian religion.
The significant presence of Ukrainian immigrants in Italy demonstrated in the Italian squares and churches for peace and to ask for support from Italy.

After the 2022 Russian invasion of Ukraine started, Italy, as one of the EU countries, imposed sanctions on Russia, and Russia added all EU countries to the list of "unfriendly nations".

Trade relations 
Trade relations were fundamental in unblocking Italian-Soviet relations after the World War II.

The market of the Soviet Union presented itself to the Italian business world with opportunities for expansion, due to the size of the territory and the demand for goods by the population. Between 1960 and 1963, the USSR's exports to Italy rose from 92 to 127 million rubles, Italy's exports to the USSR from 81 to 121 million rubles.

There were three main commercial operations launched in the decade 1958-1968: the agreement with ENI to import oil from the USSR signed in 1960 (which was renewed in the following years); the 1966 agreement with FIAT to produce cars in Tolyatti (named after Togliatti.); the construction of the ENI gas pipeline to supply Italy with methane from Soviet fields, the negotiations for which began in the mid-1960s and ended in 1969.

From an economic point of view, Russia and Italy have established a strong cooperation, especially in the energy domain. This strategic partnership is founded on commercial and energy interests.  Energy sales are the most important category in trade exchanges. The two countries have begun a cooperation in various other sectors, such as: the construction and automobile industries, but also aeronautics and military vehicles.

Trade relations between Russia and Italy experienced an increase this century, apart from during the financial crisis of 2008 that provoked a serious contraction. Because of the economic crisis, there was a decrease in trade of about one third in 2019 (down to 18.5 million euros).

Agreements 
Most of the relations between Russia and Italy are regulated by agreements stipulated between Russia and the European Union, of which Italy is part. But there are also some bilateral treaties currently in force between Italy and Russia.

Bilateral Investment Treaty Italy - Russian Federation 
A Bilateral Investment Treaty (BIT) was stipulated between Italy and the Russian Federation and signed on 9 April of 1996. It entered into force on 7 July 1997. The agreement regards the promotion and protection of foreign investments between the two parties. The initial duration was of 15 years with an automatic renewal of 5 years. The parties can unilaterally decide to terminate the treaty at any time, against a notification to the other party, but in this BIT there is also the “sunset clause” which guarantees that all investment made prior to the termination of the treaty continues to be protected during a certain period of time, most of the time 5, 10 or 20 years. 

The agreement is currently in force and provides all rules and regulations about the investment between the contracting parties and also provides the definition of investment and investor which is crucial because only the investment and investor which falls within the definitions of the treaty are entitled to the protection provided by the treaty. The treaty provides also all the standards of treatment which have been negotiated between the parties; the agreement provides for National Treatment, Most-fevered-nation Treatment, Fair and Equitable Treatment, Full protection and security, Prohibition on unreasonable, arbitrary or discriminatory measures, Expropriation, Protection from strife, Transfer of funds, Prohibition of performance requirement, Umbrella Clause, Entry and sojourn of personnel. Additionally, the agreement provides the rules for dispute settlement, and there clarify the difference between the “State-State Dispute Settlement” and the “Investor-State Dispute Settlement”.

The outbreak of the war in Ukraine has changed the relations of the whole international community; there are many economic changes and foreign investment is no exception, and in the face of economic and political decisions by Russia and Western countries some alleged violation of the BIT between Italy and the Russian Federation could occur.

Russia has responded to the economic sanctions imposed by the Western governments by enacting or threatening counter measures. In the first place, the Russia’s ruling party announced draft legislation, expressly endorsed by President Vladimir Putin, about the “Nationalization Counter-measure” that will authorize Russian courts to place Russian companies with foreign shareholder (including from the European Union) into external administration (a reorganization under Russia’s bankruptcy law, with an external manager immediately displacing current management) if they take steps to decrease, suspend, or wind down their operation. Additionally, Russia imposed the “Transfer Counter-measure” concerning the imposition of restriction on the ability of foreign investors to divest their shares in Russia subsidiaries and immovable property, as well as on the transfer of proceeds or other founds denominated in foreign currency without an express licence from the Russian government.

If Russia confirms all these measures, Italian investors in Russia could suffer large losses and disputes that would be settled through mediation or conciliation could arise, but if they don’t work investors may claim compensation thanks to the clauses present in the BIT between Italy and Russian Federation.

Memorandum of understanding for collaboration in the health sector 
A memorandum of understanding for collaboration in the health sector between the Italian Ministry of Health and the Ministry of Health of the Russian Federation was signed in Trieste on 26 November 2013. The duration of the Memorandum is 5 years with automatically renewal unless one of the parties decides to terminate the agreement.

This agreement has different fields of cooperation: 

 Prevention of communicable and non-communicable disease
 Protection of maternal and child health
 E-health, telemedicine and other information and communication technologies applied in health
 Organisation of national health system, insurance system and related regulatory aspects
 Transplantation of organs, cells and tissues
 Introduction of innovative medical technologies and procedures
 Teaching methodologies in the health field

Agreement between Italy and the Russian Federation on dismantling of nuclear weapons 
The Agreement on cooperation in the dismantling of nuclear weapons subject to reduction in the Russian Federation in the field of cultural, technical, scientific and economic cooperation was signed on 1 January 1993 and entered into force 15 March 1995. The duration of the agreement was 5 years with tacit renewal, and in 2022 is still active.

Through this agreement Italy assists the Russian Federation in the dismantling of nuclear weapons subject to reduction according to the Treaty on the non-proliferation of nuclear weapons signed on 1 July 1968.

See also 
Foreign relations of Italy
Foreign relations of Russia
Scuola Italiana Italo Calvino
Russia–European Union relations
Capriccio Italien

Notes

References

Further reading
 Carbone, Maurizio. "Russia's Trojan Horse in Europe? Italy and the War in Georgia." Italian Politics 24 (2008): 135-151 online.

 Collina, Cristian. "A bridge in times of confrontation: Italy and Russia in the context of EU and NATO enlargements." Journal of Modern Italian Studies 13.1 (2008): 25–40.

 Katz, Mark N. "Russia in the Mediterranean and the Middle East." IEMed. MEDITERRANEAN YEARBOOK (2021) online.

 Mikhelidze, Nona. "Italy and Russia: New Alignment or More of the Same." IAI Commentaries 19 (2019): 28+ online.
 Natalizia, Gabriele, and Mara Morini. "Sleeping with the enemy: The not-so-constant Italian stance towards Russia." Italian Political Science 15.1 (2020): 42-59. online

 Patalakh, Artem. "Italy as the Kremlin’s ‘Trojan Horse’in Europe: Some Overlooked Factors." E-International Relations (2020) online.

 Prontera, Andrea. "Italy, Russia and the Great Reconfiguration in East–West Energy Relations." Europe-Asia Studies 73.4 (2021): 647-672.
 Sergeevna, Ozerkova Ekaterina. "The migration issue in Russian-Italian relations (2014-2019)." (2021) online
 Siddi, Marco. "Italy-Russia relations: Politics, energy and other businesses." ast European (2012): 73+ online.

External links

Soviet-Italian Agreements at Great Soviet Encyclopedia

 
Russia
Bilateral relations of Russia